Marc Noë (born 18 October 1962) is a Belgian football manager and former player who played as a midfielder.

References

1962 births
Living people
Belgian footballers
Association football midfielders
Belgian Pro League players
Challenger Pro League players
K. Sint-Niklase S.K.E. players
K. Berchem Sport players
K. Boom F.C. players
K.F.C. Verbroedering Geel players
Belgian football managers
Beerschot A.C. managers